Howrah Uttar Assembly constituency is an assembly constituency in Howrah district in the Indian state of West Bengal.

Overview
As per orders of the Delimitation Commission, No. 170 Howrah Uttar Assembly constituency is composed of the following: Ward Nos. 1 to 7 and 10 to 16 of Howrah Municipal Corporation.

Howrah Uttar Assembly constituency is part of No. 25 Howrah (Lok Sabha constituency).

Members of Legislative Assembly

Election results

2021

2016

.# Swing calculated on LF+Congress vote percentages taken together in 2016.

2011

 

.# Swing calculated on Congress+Trinamool Congress vote percentages taken together in 2006.

1977-2006
In the 2006, 2001, 1996 and 1991 state assembly elections Lagan Deo Singh of  CPI(M) won the Howrah North assembly seat defeating his nearest rivals Bani Singha of Trinamool Congress in 2006, Asok Ghosh of Congress in the three other years. Contests in most years were multi cornered but only winners and runners are being mentioned. Asok Ghosh of Congress defeated Lagan Deo Singh of CPI(M) in 1987 and Chittabrata Majumdar of CPI(M) in 1982. Chittabrata Mazumdar of CPI(M) defeated Supriya Basu of Congress in 1977.

1967-1972
Shankarlal Mukherjee of Congress won in 1972 and 1971. Nirmal Kumar Mukherjee of Congress won in 1969. S.K.Mukherjee of Congress won in 1967.

1951-1962
During the period Howrah had four Vidhan Sabha constituencies.

Howrah North
Saila Mukherjee of Congress won in 1962. Samar Mukhopadhyay of CPI won in 1957. Biren Banerjee of CPI won in 1951.

Howrah West
Anadi Dass, Independent, won in 1962. Bankim Chandra Kar of Congress won in 1957 and 1951.

Howrah East
Bejoy Bhattacharyya of Congress won in 1962. Beni Charan Dutta of Congress won in 1957. Saila Kumar Mukhopdhyay of Congress won in 1951.

For results of Howrah South constituency see Howrah Dakshin Assembly constituency

References

Assembly constituencies of West Bengal
Politics of Howrah district
1967 establishments in West Bengal
Constituencies established in 1967